In for the Kill is a 2004 album by American rock and roll singer Kevin DuBrow, best known as a member of the group Quiet Riot. A collection of cover versions originally performed by other artists, it was DuBrow's only solo album before his death in 2007. The tracks are predominantly his version of 1970s rock songs.

Track listing
“Burn on the Flame” (Sweet) 3:46
“Good Rocking Tonight” (Roy Brown) 3:04
“Black Sheep of the Family” (Quatermass) 4:21
“Speed King” (Deep Purple) 4:16
“Stay with Me” (Faces) 4:47
“Red Light Mama, Red Hot!” (Humble Pie) 6:22
“Gonna Have a Good Time” (The Easybeats) 4:05
“Modern Times Rock ’n’ Roll” (Queen) 1:47
“Drivin’ Sister” (Mott the Hoople) 4:08
“20th Century Boy” (T. Rex) 4:34
“Razamanaz” (Nazareth) 4:10
“Rolling with My Baby” (Silverhead) 3:26

Personnel
Band:
 Kevin DuBrow - Lead and Backing vocals
 Michael Lardie - Guitars, Keyboards, Harmonica, Harp, Backing vocals
 Kevin Curry - Guitars
 Gunter Nezhoda - Bass guitar
 Jeff Martin - Drums, percussion

Additional performers:
 Chris Logan - Backing vocals
 Peter Marrino - Backing vocals

External links
In For The Kill at Shrapnel Records

2004 debut albums
Covers albums
Kevin DuBrow albums